Bouriane is a natural region of France located in the department of Lot, but with a smaller part in Lot-et-Garonne. Its capital is the small town of Gourdon.

History
Historically, Bouriane was part of the Quercy, an ancient province which extends up to the river Dordogne and neighbours the Périgord. The region is characterized by its sandy soils and gentle hills covered with forests where chestnut trees predominate.

Features of the region

References

External links
|or!&url=/lot/FR/iti.htm Circuit de la Bouriane

Geography of Lot (department)
Geographical, historical and cultural regions of France
Natural regions of France